Dr.Shriram Lagoo (16 November 1927 – 17 December 2019) was an Indian film and theatre actor, in Hindi and Marathi, in addition to being an ENT Surgeon. He was known for his character roles in films. He acted in over 250 films including Hindi and Marathi films as well as Hindi, Marathi and Gujarati plays, and directed over 20 Marathi plays. He was also very vocal and active in furthering progressive and rational social causes, for example in 1999, he and social activist G. P. Pradhan undertook a fast in support of anti-corruption crusader Anna Hazare. He won the 1978 Filmfare Award for Best Supporting Actor for the Hindi film Gharaonda. His autobiography is titled Lamaan, which means "the carrier of goods".

Early life 

Shreeram Lagoo was born in Satara district, Maharashtra, India to Balakrishna Chintaman Lagoo and Satyabhama Lagoo, and was the eldest of four children. He attended Bhave High School, Fergusson College (University of Pune) and B. J. Medical College (University of Pune), India and received MBBS & MS degrees-both medical degrees.

Career 

Shreeram Lagoo started acting in plays while attending Medical College. Once bitten by theatre bug, he continued his dramatic activity through a group  "Progressive Dramatic Association", which he started with like-minded senior friends like Bhalba Kelkar.
Meanwhile, he received a degree in ENT Surgery from University of Mumbai in the early fifties and practised in Pune for six years before going to Canada and England for additional training.

He practised medicine and surgery in Pune, India and Tabora, Tanzania in the sixties, but his theatre activity through Progressive Dramatic Association in Pune and "Rangaayan" in Mumbai continued when he was in India. Finally, in 1969 he became a full-time actor on Marathi stage, debuting in the play Ithe Oshalala Mrityu, written by Vasant Kanetkar.

Lagoo finally started working as a full-time drama actor in the year 1969, from Vasant Kanetkar's play "Where Death Shied Away". He played a leading role in the play 'Natsamrat' written by Kusumagraj (Vishnu Vaman Shirwadkar) and was best remembered for that role. He had a legendary status in Marathi cinema, where he did many memorable movies which included successes like Sinhasan, Pinjra and Mukta.

His wife, Deepa Lagoo, is also a noted theatre, TV, and film actress. He had two sons and a daughter. Lagoo also instituted the prestigious Tanveer Samman, given to most promising stalwart in theatre industry of India, in the memory of his late son Tanveer Lagoo.

Some of his best performances in Hindi films were when he was pitted with Rajesh Khanna in films like Thodisi Bewafai, Maqsad, Souten, Nasihat, Awam. His other best performances came in films like Devata, Des Pardes, Lawaris, Muqaddar Ka Sikander, Inkaar, Sajan Bin Suhagan, Kinara, Lootmaar, Sau Crore, Jyoti Bane Jwala, Neeyat, Nishana, Swayamvar, Shriman Shrimati, and Sadma.

Filmography

Marathi movies 
 Pinjra (1972) as Teacher
 Samna (1975) as Master
 Kathputli (1976)
 Sinhasan (1979) as Vishwasrao Dabhade
 Zaakol (1980)
 Khichadi (1982)
 Mukta (1994) as Mukta's Grandfather
 Masala (2012)
 Nagrik (2014) as Nana Chitnis
 Shasan (2016) as Vishwasrao Tidke

Marathi plays
 Vedyache Ghar Unhat
 Jagannathacha Rath
 Gidhade
 Kachecha Chandra
 Himalayachi Sawali
 Natsamrat
 Surya Pahilela Manus
 Aadhe Adhure
 Garbo
 Atmakatha
 kanyadaan
 Pappa saanga kunache!
 Premachi Goshta?
 Khoon pahava karoon
 Dubhang
 Sundaar Mi Honaar
 Kirwant
 Mitra
 Ithe Oshadhla Mrutyu

Hindi movies 

 Sugandhi Katta (1974)
 Mere Saath Chal (1974) as Ravi
 Ponga Pandit (1975) as Professor
 Raeeszada (1976) as Shiv Narayan Saxena
 Hera Pheri (1976) as Police Commissioner Khanna
 Bullet (1976) as Seth. Ghanshyamdas
 Chalte Chalte (1976) as Roy
 Barood (1976) as Inspector Durgaprasad Saxena
 Aaj Ka Ye Ghar (1976) as Sajjan
 Immaan Dharam (1977) as Govind Anna
 Shankar Hussain (1977)
 Mandir Masjid (1977)
 Kitaab (1977) as Baijuram
 Kinara (1977)
 Inkaar (1977) as Haridas Choudhury
 Gharaonda (1977) as Modi
 Duniyadari (1977) as Panditji
 Agar... If (1977) as Ashok Saxena
 Mera Rakshak (1978) as Avinash Rai 
 Naya Daur (1978) as Jenny's dad
 Arvind Desai Ki Ajeeb Dastaan (1978) as Dharmsi Desai
 Damaad (1978) as Shreedhar Mazgaonkar
 Des Pardes (1978) as Mr. Bond
 Phool Khile Hain Gulshan Gulshan (1978)
 College Girl (1978)
 Muqaddar Ka Sikandar (1978) as Ramanath
 Devata (1978) as Father Fernandez
 Saajan Bina Suhagan (1978) as Gopal Chopra 
 Shalimar (1978) as Tolaram
 Arvind Desai Ki Ajeeb Dastaan (1978) as Dharmsi Desai
 Anjaam (1978) as Dinanath
 Sargam (1979) as Masterji Chintamani Pradhan
 Muqabla (1979) as Sabbarbaba
 Magroor (1979) as Chacha
 Jurmana (1979) as Prof. Dayashankar Sharma
 Meera (1979) as Raja Biramdev Rathod
 Manzil (1979) as Mr. Kapoor
 Tarana (1979) (Mithun Chakraborty, Ranjeeta Kaur, Bhagwan) as Rana
 Hum Tere Ashiq Hain (1979) as Pradhan
 Ladke Baap Se Badke (1979) as Verma
 Dooriyaan (1979) as Prabhakar
 Aapli Manse (1979)
 Fatakadi (1980)
 Do Aur Do Paanch (1980) as Rai Bahadur Mathur
 Kashish (1980)
 Lootmaar (1980) as Seth Ramniklal
 Thodisi Bewafaii (1980) as Surendra Deshmukh
 Jyoti Bane Jwala (1980) as O.P. Bakshi
 Neeyat (1980) as Arvind - Vijay's brother
 Gehrayee (1980) as Chennabassapa
 Insaaf Ka Tarazu (1980) as Mr. Chandra (Lawyer)
Jwalamukhi (1980 film) as Anand
 Swayamvar (1980) as Ratanlal
 Nishana (1980) as Poonam's father
 Kasturi (1980) as Prof. Prashant
 Bin Maa Ke Bachche (1980) as Motiram - Ashok's & Gauri's father
 Yeh Kaisa Nashaa Hai (1981)
 Sweety (1981)
 Ehsaan Aap Ka (1981) as Meeta's Uncle
 Aakhri Mujra (1981) as Anand Narayan
 Chehre Pe Chehra (1981) as Priest
 Agni Pareeksha (1981) as Advocate Anupam
 Laawaris (1981) as Gangu Ganpat
 Ghungroo Ki Awaaz (1981) as Jasbir Singh 'Mamaji'
 Shama (1981) as Governor
 Zamaane Ko Dikhana Hai (1981) as Mr. S.K. Nanda
 Sansani: The Sensation (1981) as Kumar Rajdev
 Raaz (1981) as Handicapped Man
 Professor Pyarelal (1981) as Kishanchand / King
 Plot No. 5 (1981) as Verma
 Mosambi Narangi (1981)
 Khara Khota (1981)
 Hum Paagal Premee (1982)
 Do Dishayen (1982)
 Raaste Pyar Ke (1982) as Dwarka Prasad (uncredited)
 Chorni (1982) as Judge Sinha
 Shriman Shrimati (1982) as Surajmal
 Ghazab (1982) as Vikram Singh
 Deedar-E-Yaar (1982) as Nawab Mirza Firad Ali Changezi
 Samraat (1982) as Gomes
 Gandhi (1982) as Professor Gopal Krishna Gokhale
 Vidhaata (1982) as Sir Mizia
 Kaamchor (1982) as Rai Bahadur Chunilal Sanghvi
 Main Intequam Loonga (1982) as Madan Agnihotri
 Dil Hi Dil Mein (1982) as Major Mahendra Pratap Singh
 Daulat (1982) as Ghanshyam / Vikram Singh
 Baawri (1982) as RajaRam Sharma
 Gumnaam Hai Koi (1983)
 Zara Si Zindagi (1983) as Mr. Shastri - Rakesh's father
 Chatpati (1983)
 Souten (1983) as Gopal
 Sadma (1983) as Khandeparkar (uncredited)
 Mujhe Insaaf Chahiye (1983) as Viswanath Agarwal - Malati's father
 Mawaali (1983) as Goyal Verma
 Pukar (1983) as Purandare
 Kalaakaar (1983) as Rohit Khanna
 Hum Se Hai Zamana (1983) as Kalicharan
 Gupchup Gupchup (1983) as Sir Saheb
 Faraib (1983) as Bansi / Upadhyay
 Bad Aur Badnaam (1984) as R. C. Dutta
 Meri Adalat (1984)
 Maqsad (1984) as Vishnupratap
 Love Marriage (1984) as Mehra
 Tarang (1984) as Sethji
 Kahan Tak Aasmaan Hai (1984)
 Hanste Khelte (1984) as Principal Dwarkadas
 Chakma (1984)
 Sarfarosh (1985) as Police Commissioner
 Holi (1985) as Chairman of collegembmmb
 Sitamgar (1985) as Mr. Nath
 Ghar Dwaar (1985) as Dhanraj
 Hum Naujawan (1985) as Home Minister Desai
 Khichdi (1985)
 Bond 303 (1985) as Prem's father - master evilmind
 Ankahee (1985) as Jyotishbhaskar Pandit Satyanarayan Chaturvedi
 Dilwaala (1986) as Ganesh Vithal Kolhapure
 Singhasan (1986) as Mahamantri Shrikant
 Raat Ke Baad (1986)
 Saveraywali Gaadi (1986) as Chhediram
 Locket (1986) as Diwan Sardarilal
 Maanav Hatya (1986)
 Kala Dhanda Goray Log (1986) as Haji Irshad Patel
 Muddat (1986) as Vikram Singh
 Nasihat (1986)
 Ek Aur Sikander (1986) as Inspector Verma
 Samay Ki Dhaara (1986) as Ajay's Employee
 Jeeva (1986) as Thakur
 Ghar Sansar (1986) as Satyanarayan
 Ek Pal (1986) as Priyam's father
 Ek main aur ek Tu (1986)
 Chhota Aadmi (1986)
 Mahananda (1987)
 Besahara (1987) as Dindayal
 Majaal (1987) as Pujari Vishnu Prasad
 Awam (1987) as Minister / Lawyer
 Insaf Ki Pukar (1987) as Jagannath
 Sher Shivaji (1987)
 Purnasatya (1987) as Baba
 Mera Karam Mera Dharam (1987) as Sarjuprasad
 Mard Ki Zabaan (1987) as Zamindar Raghupathi Sahay
 Kaamaagni (1987)
 Chhakke Panje (1987)
 Dukh-Dard (1988)
 Aurat Teri Yehi Kahani (1988) as Dharamraj
 Tamacha (1988) as Chandra Pratap Singh
 Charnon Ki Saugandh (1988) as Govind
 Waqt Ki Awaz (1988) as Ishwar Prasad
 Namumkin (1988) as Ashok Saxena
 Muhabbat Ki Hai Humne (1989)
 Apne Begaane (1989)
 Touhean (1989) as Deepika's Father
 Daana Paani (1989) as D. R. Singh
 Ek Din Achanak (1989) as Professor (Neeta's father)
 Nache Nagin Gali Gali (1989) as Seth Girdharilal
 Gharana (1989) as Prem Mehra 
 Galiyon Ka Badshah (1989) as Abdul
 Ek Ratra Manterleli (1989) as Solicitor Pradhan
 Kuldeepak (1990)
 Kishen Kanhaiya (1990) as Sunder Das
 Suryodaya (1991)
 Dushman Devta (1991) as Master Dina Nath
 Sau Crore (1991) as Judge
 Phoolwati (1991)
 Lakhpati (1991)
 Baat Hai Pyaar Ki (1991) as Anjali's father
 Rajoo Dada (1992)
 Naya Sawan (1992)
 Current
 Sarphira (1992) as Judge B. K. Sinha
 Geet Milan Ke Gaate Rehenge (1992)
 Immaculate Conception (1992) as Dadaji / Samira's grandfather
 Zunz Tujhi Majhi (1992) as Nagvekar
 Naseebwaala (1992) as Sharda's Father
 Kisme Kitna Hai Dum (1992)
 Hach Sunbaicha Bahu (1992)
 Maya (1993)
 Badi Bahen (1993) as Dwarkaprasad
 Pyaar Ka Tarana (1993)
 Shivrayachi Soon Tararani (1993) as Badshah Aurangzeb
 Khuddar (1994) as Shastri Suri
 Gopalaa (1994) as Chief Minister
 Sajan Ka Dard (1995)
 Hahakaar (1996) as Commissioner of Police
 Aurat Aurat Aurat (1996) as Barrister Vajpai
 Aatank (1996) as Catholic Priest 
 Dhyasparva (2001)
 Pandhar (2004)
 Aahat – Ek Ajib Kahani (2010)
 One Room Kitchen (2011) as Special appearance
 Nagrik (2014) as Nana Chitnis
 The Great Freedom Fighter Lokmanya Bal Gangadhar Tilak - Swaraj My Birthright (2018) as Dadabhai Navroji (final film role)

Awards and recognition 

 1978, Filmfare Award for Best Supporting Actor for Gharaonda
1978, Nominated - Filmfare Award for Best Supporting Actor for Kinara
1981, Nominated - Filmfare Award for Best Supporting Actor for Insaf Ka Tarazu
 1997, Kalidas Samman
 2006, Awarded the Master Dinanath Mangeshkar Smruti Pratisthan for his contribution to cinema and theater.
 2007, Punyabhushan Puraskar
 2010, Sangeet Natak Akademi Fellowship

Religious beliefs 

Shriram was a known non-religious rationalist. Once after being conferred with an award called Punyabhushan (Pride of Pune) on behalf of the organization called Tridal, he was interviewed by Sudhir Gadgil. When asked about Jabbar Patel's play, wherein Lagoo had to stand before Lord Vitthal, "Did you stand there as a devotee or only as per the demand of the script?" Lagoo replied "I stood there as if I was standing in front of a stone idol that is known as Panduranga".

He has written an article titled "Time to Retire God", which provoked hot discussions in the print media and other public platforms in India. This article was written as an introduction to a book on Abraham Kovoor. In this article, Lagoo logically came to the conclusion that the concept of God is defunct.

He is actively associated with the anti-superstition movement in Maharashtra. He used to call God as another superstition and his lectures during the ANS programs used to go like this:

I do not believe in God and I feel it is now time to retire God. Concept of God is a very beautiful product of poet’s imagination and was essential during the initial stages of civilization but the time has come when one should face the world with a completely rational attitude. For the past five thousand years, there has been no proof of the existence of God and faith in a phenomenon, which cannot be proved scientifically, is nothing short of superstition. Many inhuman practices, atrocities and wars have taken place in the name of "God". It is not only necessary, but also our duty to abolish the concept of God to end these consequences because it is a great injustice committed against humanity.

Only rational thinking has the capacity which places person above all living beings, but when he/she believes in God he/she gives up this ability and blindly accepts what has been told. He/she submits his/her intellect to passive conditioning and then there is no difference between him/her and an animal.

In the early stages of civilization, when human beings began to live in a society, the concept of superior being was necessary to maintain morality, which came out of fear. Also many of the natural phenomena, which scared human beings and to which they could not attribute any reason, came to be regarded as manifestations of the divine power. But today, when man has the mastery over nature and accepts any theory only after verifying it on a scientific basis, there is no need for the concept of a supreme being. What is needed is a broad based value system of humanity.

References

External links 
 

1927 births
2019 deaths
Savitribai Phule Pune University alumni
Indian male film actors
Indian male stage actors
Male actors in Hindi cinema
Indian atheists
Marathi people
Male actors in Marathi cinema
Recipients of the Sangeet Natak Akademi Award
Recipients of the Sangeet Natak Akademi Fellowship
Male actors in Marathi theatre
Recipients of the Padma Shri in arts
Filmfare Awards winners